The Stewart County School District is a public school district in Stewart County, Georgia, United States, based in Lumpkin. It serves the communities of Lumpkin, Omaha, and Richland.

Schools
The Stewart County School District contains one elementary school, one middle school, and one high school.

Elementary school
Stewart County Elementary School

Middle school
Stewart County Middle School

High school
Stewart County High School

References

External links

School districts in Georgia (U.S. state)
Education in Stewart County, Georgia